The Kamov Ka-35 (or Ka-31SV/Ka-252SV) is the newest Russian early warning radar-carrying helicopter. The Ka-35 has passed all tests and has been authorized for service. It is equipped with a rotating laterally oriented antenna of the L381 complex. In late October 2016, the helicopter was deployed to Syria.

See also
 Kamov Ka-31

External links
 Newest early warning radar-carrying helicopter Ka-35 authorized for service – Russian News Agency TASS
 Вертолет-разведчик Ка-35 появился над Сирией - in Russian

Kamov aircraft
Soviet and Russian helicopters
AWACS aircraft
Military helicopters